The 1977 Arkansas Razorbacks football team represented the University of Arkansas in the Southwest Conference (SWC) during the 1977 NCAA Division I football season. In their first year under head coach Lou Holtz, the Razorbacks compiled an 11–1 record (7–1 against SWC opponents), finished in second place in the SWC, and outscored their opponents by a combined total of 389 to 101. The Razorbacks' only loss was to SWC champion Texas by a 13–9 score. The team advanced to 1978 Orange Bowl, defeating #2 Oklahoma by a 31–6 score.  Arkansas was ranked #3 in both the final AP Poll and the final UPI Coaches Poll.

Offensive guard Leotis Harris and placekicker Steve Little were both consensus first-team picks for the 1977 College Football All-America Team. Little punted 48 times for 2,127 yards, and had the fourth-best average in college football, with 44.3 yards per punt. Little scored an average of 8.5 points per game for the Razorbacks, including 19 field goals (30 attempted) and 37 extra points. This was the eighth-best average per game, and the second-best among kickers. His 1.73 field goals per game was second-best to Paul Marchese of Kent State.

The Razorbacks also had the third-best scoring defense and tied for the fourth-best pass defense. The Hogs, along with the Indiana Hoosiers, gave up only 89.5 yards per game through the air, and the Hogs only surrendered 8.6 points per game. Only North Carolina and Ohio State allowed fewer points in 1977. The Hogs were ranked third by the AP, behind runner-up Alabama and champion Notre Dame. Rothman (FACT), a mathematical rating system in use since 1968 and NCAA-designated major selector, selected Arkansas as co-national champions with Notre Dame and Texas.

Schedule

Coaching staff

Roster
QB Ron Calcagni, Jr.
Dan Hampton
PK Steve Little
G George Stewart

Orange Bowl

The 1978 Orange Bowl was played between #6 Arkansas and #2 Oklahoma. Entering the game, the Hogs were twenty-one point underdogs against the Sooners. Arkansas had three offensive starters suspended for the contest and another injured in bowl practice, which also led fans to believe the Sooners would roll.
Roland Sales of Arkansas rushed for 205 yards on 23 carries, setting an Orange Bowl record. Sales would hold the record until Ahman Green carried for 206 yards in 1998, beating Sales by a single yard. He came in relief of star running back Ben Cowins, who the Hogs left in Fayetteville for a violation of team rules. Sales began the scoring on a one-yard run after a Billy Sims fumble. Hog QB Ron Calcagni would score next, after a fumble by Oklahoma fullback Kenny King. Steve Little completed a field goal to give the Hogs a 17–0 cushion in the third quarter. Sales scored on a four-yard run to stretch the Hog advantage to 24–0. Oklahoma would score on an eight-yard touchdown pass, but the Hogs would stop the two-point conversion. Barnabas White would tack on another Razorback touchdown, getting the ball from Mike Scott playing quarterback for the Hogs.

References

Arkansas
Arkansas Razorbacks football seasons
Orange Bowl champion seasons
Arkansas Razorbacks football